Howard Douglas Baird (September 27, 1891 in St. Charles, Missouri – June 13, 1967 in Thomasville, Georgia), was a professional baseball player who played third base in Major League Baseball from 1915 to 1920. He went to college at Westminster College.

References

External links

1891 births
1967 deaths
Westminster Blue Jays baseball players
Major League Baseball third basemen
Brooklyn Robins players
Pittsburgh Pirates players
St. Louis Cardinals players
New York Giants (NL) players
Philadelphia Phillies players
Baseball players from Missouri
Springfield Senators players
Springfield Watchmakers players
Indianapolis Indians players
Columbus Senators players
Birmingham Barons players
Little Rock Travelers players